Lozotaenia rindgei is a species of moth of the family Tortricidae first described by Obraztsov in 1962. It is found in North America, where it has been recorded from Yukon, British Columbia, Oregon, Wyoming, Washington and North Carolina.

The wingspan is about 21–22 mm. The forewings are light greyish brown to light brown, finely reticulated (a net-like pattern) with dark brown. The hindwings are uniform grey. Adults have been recorded on wing from late June to August.

References

Moths described in 1962
Archipini